Marcus Paul Davis (born August 24, 1973), is an American professional mixed martial artist and former professional boxer who is perhaps best known for competing in the UFC. A professional MMA competitor from 2003 until 2014, Davis also competed for Bellator MMA, the MFC, the Cage Fury Fighting Championships, and was a contestant on The Ultimate Fighter 2.

Background
Davis was born in Houlton, Maine and raised in Bangor, Maine by his single mother along with his brother, Ron who is six years older than Marcus. Davis was troubled growing up, often getting into fights. He was also stabbed twice, shot at on more than one occasion, and witnessed rapes at a young age. He began karate when he was eight years old because there were no boxing gyms in his town, though he would eventually start boxing when he was 14 years old, having his first amateur match later that year. Davis attended Bangor High School and became a professional boxer when he was 18 years old. At 19, Davis began his career with a second round TKO of Luis Guzman in April 1993 and compiled a professional record of 17–1–2 over the next seven years on the New England circuit, where he fought primarily as a Junior-Middleweight. In his last fight as a boxer, he suffered a TKO loss to 34-year-old Ed Bryant which led him to reconsider his future as a successful boxer. He then became excited with the challenge of mixed martial arts, much to the bemusement of his peers. He retired from boxing after the TKO loss in October 2000. In 1995, Davis, then based in Massachusetts, began training in grappling with Joe Maffei. In 1997, he moved back to Bangor and opened up an MMA school, while running a bar. The doormen took classes at the school, one of whom was Tim Sylvia. After Sylvia joined Miletich Fighting Systems in 2000, Davis quickly followed. More recently, Davis has trained with Mark Dellagrotte and his own team in Bangor, Team Sityodtong.

Mixed martial arts career

Early career
Davis entered professional MMA on August 22, 2003, with a first-round TKO of Shaun Gay. Though later describing himself as "one-dimensional", Davis was able to put together a 3–2 professional record.

Ultimate Fighting Championship
In 2005, Marcus was a contestant on The Ultimate Fighter 2. Coming in with reputed boxing skills, he picked Joe Stevenson in episode four in what proved to be a mismatch as Davis was quickly taken down by the eventual winner and submitted. He was later brought back in episode ten to cover for Jason Von Flue, who suffered a cut on his forehead in practice, though Von Flue's cut was healed enough in time to fight. Marcus fought on the undercard of the finale, where he lost to Melvin Guillard.

Following the series, Davis strongly considered retirement but recuperated from a shoulder injury picked up against Joe Stevenson and went back to MMA training. Davis subsequently bounced back with 11 wins, including a triumphant return to the UFC at Ortiz vs. Shamrock 3: The Final Chapter.

In Davis' fight against Paul Taylor at UFC 75 in London, England he was knocked down by a high kick to the neck, but was able to recover, gain a dominant position, and secure an armbar as Taylor desperately scrambled to regain control. Marcus won Fight of the night as well as submission of the night for that fight. For earning the submission and fight of the night awards, he was awarded $80,000 in bonuses.  His next fight was a highlight-reel knockout win against fierce rival Jess Liaudin at UFC 80 in Newcastle, England.

Marcus Davis lost a very one sided unanimous decision to Mike Swick at UFC 85, ending his six fight undefeated streak in the octagon and eleven fight winning streak in MMA. He got back to winning ways with a submission victory over England's Paul Kelly at UFC 89.

Davis' fought Chris Lytle at UFC 93 on January 17, 2009. Both fighters are former boxers and had discussed a potential fight in their futures since early 2008. Lytle called out Davis at UFC 89. He suggested that the fight take place in Ireland, where Davis had gained a substantial following due to his emphasis on his Irish roots. Leading up to the event, both fighters promised to stand and trade blows for the entire fight, rather than engage in grappling. Lytle managed to stun Davis several times, but Davis used superior footwork, counter-punching, and kicks to win a split decision. The bout shared Fight of the Night honors with the Coleman/Rua co-main event, earning Davis a $40,000 bonus.

Davis fought on June 13, 2009, against up and coming striker Dan Hardy. The fight became personal when Hardy took offense to Davis defeating British-based fighters in Britain. Hardy called Davis a "fake Irishman" as well as a "Plastic Paddy" and said his website "looked like a St. Patrick's day parade had blown up".
Hardy posted photos of Davis on Cagewarriors.com which resulted in many being edited in "humorous" fashions by forum users. Some of these edits included homosexual imagery which touched a nerve with Davis and increased the ill-feeling between the two. Hardy won the fight via a narrow and controversial split decision. After the fight, Davis expressed his anger at the decision, stating, "I won the fight. I won 12 minutes of the fight and they gave it to him? You bet I want a rematch, right away."

Davis suffered his first knock out loss by Ben Saunders due to knee on November 21, 2009, at UFC 106. This knockout loss resulting in Davis receiving a medical suspension of up to six months because of a broken nose.

Davis fought Jonathan Goulet at UFC 113. He won via TKO due to punches in the second round.

Davis lost to Nate Diaz on August 28, 2010, at UFC 118 via technical submission (guillotine choke) in the third round.

In an interview with MMA Junkie.com Davis confirmed he would drop to the Lightweight division for his next UFC appearance and said he made the decision after the realization that his frame is better suited for 155 pounds. Davis also confirmed that he was contemplating retirement stating "I'm going to finish out my career at 155 and try to entertain some people along the way before my old ass retires," Davis also stated "That's where I'm normally and naturally going to be, so that's where I'm going to fight right now," he said of the 155-pound lightweight division. "It does make more sense that I should be able to compete better at that weight for the fact that the weight difference isn't going to be so dramatic."

Davis fought Jeremy Stephens on January 1, 2011 at UFC 125. After a back and forth fight which saw Davis getting an edge on the judges' scorecards, he was knocked out by a counter right hook at 2:33 of the third round.

On January 6, 2011 it was announced that Davis had been released by the UFC after losing four out of his last five bouts.

Maximum Fighting Championship
It was announced that Davis signed a contract with the Maximum Fighting Championship company, and had signed on to fight Curtis Demarce at MFC 29. He won the fight via split decision. Davis returned at MFC 30, defeating Pete Spratt by unanimous decision in a rematch of their bout from UFC 69.

Independent promotions
Davis was scheduled to face Josh Hersey on September 23 at Global Fight League 13: Heavy Hitters
in Portland, Maine, but Hersey pulled out of the bout due to a knee injury and was replaced by Travis Coyle. Davis defeated Coyle via submission in the first round. Davis fought Ultimate Fighter 13 alumnus Chuck O'Neil in a Welterweight bout at W-1 Reloaded in Miami, Florida on October 15. The bout was to be the co-main event but was later promoted to the main event after Jeff Monson pulled out of his fight with Gabriel Gonzaga. Davis lost by split decision.

Davis was scheduled to fight Matt Lee at Century Fighting Championship: Davis vs. Lee on March 31, 2012 in Salem, New Hampshire. However the event was postponed.

On May 6, 2012, Davis turned his hand to kickboxing to challenge Mark Casserly for the ISKA World Light Cruiserweight (-84.6 kg/186.5 lb) Oriental Championship in Dublin, Ireland, losing by head-kick knockout in round one.

Davis replaced Karo Parisyan and faced David Bielkheden at Superior Challenge 8 on October 6, 2012 in Malmo, Sweden. He won by unanimous decision.

Davis fought against Darrius Heyliger on May 18, 2013 at NEF 7. Davis defeated Heyliger via unanimous decision.

Following his loss to Alexander Sarnavskiy, Davis faced Ryan Sanders at NEF: Fight Night 12 on February 8, 2014. In a shocking upset, Davis lost the fight via doctor stoppage TKO.

Bellator MMA
Davis made his Bellator debut on March 21, 2013 at Bellator 93 against Waachiim Spiritwolf. The bout ended in a no contest when Davis hit Spiritwolf with an inadvertent knee to the groin in the first round and he could not continue.

Davis faced Alexander Sarnavskiy on September 27, 2013 at Bellator 101 in the Quarterfinals of Bellator's Season Nine Lightweight Tournament. He lost via rear-naked choke submission in the first round.

A comment was made via Marcus Davis' YouTube account that he would be retiring in 2014.

Return to competition
On July 21, 2020, news surfaced that Davis is expected to face Nick Alley at Premier FC 31 on October 3, 2020. The bout was later cancelled and Davis was rebooked against Stephen Stengel  on November 19, 2021 at Premier FC 32. He won the fight via first-round submission.

Other media
Davis appeared on Total Nonstop Action Wrestling's weekly television program Impact! and at the Lockdown pay-per-view event in April 2008 as Samoa Joe's personal trainer for his TNA World Heavyweight Championship match against Kurt Angle. He also presented the winner of the match with the TNA Championship. In November 2010, Davis received a Legislative Sentiment sponsored by State Representative Chris Greeley of Maine, for his success as a fighter and for the recognition and attention he's brought to both the state of Maine, and the sport of mixed martial arts as a whole. (Greeley started training with Davis and Team Irish in January 2011.)  Davis also co-hosts a weekly radio program, Pull No Punches Radio, every Friday night. He appeared on Season 2 of Doomsday Preppers as an MMA instructor.

Personal life
Davis is three times married and twice divorced. He has four children. Davis' family comes from Waterford, Ireland. Aside from fighting and boxing, Davis has managed bars, night clubs, and used to work as a bouncer.

Championships and accomplishments

Mixed martial arts
Ultimate Fighting Championship
Knockout of the Night (One time)
Submission of the Night (One time)
Fight of the Night (Three times)

Professional boxing record

{|class="wikitable" style="text-align:center; font-size:95%"
|-
!
!Result
!Record
!Opponent
!Method
!Round, time
!Date
!Location
!Notes
|-
|20
|Loss
|17–1–2
|style="text-align:left;"| Ed Bryant
|TKO
|4 (6), 2:39
|Oct 13, 2000
|style="text-align:left;"| 
|style="text-align:left;"|
|-
|19
|Win
|17–0–2
|style="text-align:left;"| Genaro Andujar
|TKO
|1
|June 2, 2000
|style="text-align:left;"| 
|style="text-align:left;"|
|-
|18
|Win
|16–0–2
|style="text-align:left;"| Tommy Attardo
|SD
|6
|April 28, 2000
|style="text-align:left;"| 
|style="text-align:left;"|
|-
|17
|Win
|15–0–2
|align=left| Richard Zola
|TKO || 2
|April 1, 2000
|style="text-align:left;"| 
|style="text-align:left;"|
|-
|16
|Win
|14–0–2
|align=left| Randy McGee
|KO
|1 (6)
|Mar 17, 2000
|style="text-align:left;"| 
|style="text-align:left;"|
|-
|15
|Win
|13–0–2
|align=left| Hollister Elliott
|UD
|8 
|July 31, 1999
|style="text-align:left;"| 
|style="text-align:left;"|
|-
|14
|Win
|12–0–2
|align=left| Tommy Attardo
|UD
|6 
|May 21, 1999
|style="text-align:left;"| 
|style="text-align:left;"|
|-
|13
|Win
|11–0–2
|style="text-align:left;"| Alexander Loubriel
|PTS
|4
|Mar 17, 1999
|style="text-align:left;"| 
|style="text-align:left;"|
|-
|12
|Win
|10–0–2
|style="text-align:left;"| John Webster
|KO
|2 (6)
|Mar 28, 1997
|style="text-align:left;"| 
|style="text-align:left;"|
|-
|11
|Draw
|9–0–2
|style="text-align:left;"| Lyndon Walker
|TD
|4
|Sep 22, 1995
|style="text-align:left;"| 
|style="text-align:left;"|
|-
|10
|Win
|9–0–1
|style="text-align:left;"| Nelson Echevarria
|KO
|1
|May 24, 1995
|style="text-align:left;"| 
|style="text-align:left;"|
|-
|9
|Win
|8–0–1
|style="text-align:left;"| Alex Ortiz
|TKO
|2
|Mar 14, 1995
|style="text-align:left;"| 
|style="text-align:left;"|
|-
|8
|Win
|7–0–1
|align=left| Andy Winstead
|TKO
|3
|Feb 25, 1995
|style="text-align:left;"| 
|style="text-align:left;"|
|-
|7
|Win
|6–0–1
|align=left| Joe LaRoux
|KO
|2
|Dec 14, 1994
|style="text-align:left;"| 
|style="text-align:left;"|
|-
|6
|Win
|5–0–1
|align=left| Chris McClellan
|TKO
|1
|Sep 17, 1994
|style="text-align:left;"| 
|style="text-align:left;"|
|-
|5
|Draw
|4–0–1
|align=left| Joe LaRoux
|TD
|1
|Aug 11, 1994
|style="text-align:left;"| 
|style="text-align:left;"|
|-
|4
|Win
|4–0
|align=left| Vernon McGriff
|UD
|6
|Jun 21, 1994
|style="text-align:left;"| 
|style="text-align:left;"|
|-
|3
|Win
|3–0
|style="text-align:left;"| Ali Whitehead
|TKO
|1
|Sep 10, 1993
|style="text-align:left;"| 
|style="text-align:left;"|
|-
|2
|Win
|2–0
|style="text-align:left;"| Jose Rodriguez
|KO
|1 (4)
|June 26, 1993
|style="text-align:left;"| 
|style="text-align:left;"|
|-
|1
|Win
|1–0
|style="text-align:left;"| Luiz Guzman
|TKO
|2 (4)
|April 23, 1993
|style="text-align:left;"| 
|style="text-align:left;"|

Kickboxing record

|-
|- bgcolor="#FFBBBB"
| 2012-05-06 || Loss ||align=left| Mark Casserly || Primal Fighting Championships 4: Worlds Collide || Dublin, Ireland || KO (right high kick) || 1 || 2:08 || 0-2
|-
! style=background:white colspan=9 |
|- bgcolor="#FFBBBB"
| 2005-02-12 || Loss ||align=left| Carlos Condit || Ring of Fire 15: Inferno || Castle Rock, Colorado || TKO || 2 || 1:03 || 0-1
|-
|-
| colspan=9 | Legend:

Mixed martial arts record

|-
| Win
| align=center| 23–11 (1)
| Stephen Stengel
| Submission (triangle choke)
| Premier FC 32
| 
| align=center| 1
| align=center|N/A
| Springfield, Massachusetts, United States
|
|-
| Loss
| align=center| 22–11 (1)
| Ryan Sanders
| TKO (doctor stoppage)
| NEF: Fight Night 12
| 
| align=center| 1
| align=center| 5:00
| Lewiston, Maine, United States
|Return to Welterweight.
|-
| Loss
| align=center| 22–10 (1)
| Alexander Sarnavskiy
| Submission (rear-naked choke)
| Bellator 101
| 
| align=center| 1
| align=center| 1:40
| Portland, Oregon, United States
| 
|-
| Win
| align=center| 22–9 (1)
| Darrius Heyliger
| Decision (unanimous)
| NEF: Fight Night 7
| 
| align=center| 3
| align=center| 5:00
| Lewiston, Maine, United States
| 
|-
| NC
| align=center| 21–9 (1)
| Waachiim Spiritwolf
| NC (knee to the groin)
| Bellator 93
| 
| align=center| 1
| align=center| 3:05
| Lewiston, Maine, United States
| 
|-
| Win
| align=center| 21–9
| David Bielkheden
| Decision (unanimous)
| Superior Challenge 8
| 
| align=center| 3
| align=center| 5:00
| Malmö, Sweden
| 
|-
| Loss
| align=center| 20–9
| Chuck O'Neil
| Decision (split)
| W-1: Reloaded
| 
| align=center| 3
| align=center| 5:00
| Miami, Florida, United States
| 
|-
| Win
| align=center| 20–8
| Travis Coyle
| Submission (guillotine choke)
| Global Fight League 13
| 
| align=center| 1
| align=center| 1:07
| Portland, Maine, United States
| 
|-
| Win
| align=center| 19–8
| Pete Spratt
| Decision (unanimous)
| MFC 30: Up Close & Personal
| 
| align=center| 3
| align=center| 5:00
| Edmonton, Alberta, Canada
| Return to Welterweight.
|-
| Win
| align=center| 18–8
| Curtis Demarce
| Decision (split)
| MFC 29: Conquer
| 
| align=center| 3
| align=center| 5:00
| Windsor, Ontario, Canada
|Lightweight bout.
|-
| Loss
| align=center| 17–8
| Jeremy Stephens
| KO (punch)
| UFC 125
| 
| align=center| 3
| align=center| 2:33
| Las Vegas, Nevada, United States
| Lightweight bout.
|-
| Loss
| align=center| 17–7
| Nate Diaz
| Technical Submission (guillotine choke)
| UFC 118
| 
| align=center| 3
| align=center| 4:02
| Boston, Massachusetts, United States
| Fight of the Night.
|-
| Win
| align=center| 17–6
| Jonathan Goulet
| TKO (punches)
| UFC 113
| 
| align=center| 2
| align=center| 1:23
| Montreal, Quebec, Canada
| 
|-
| Loss
| align=center| 16–6
| Ben Saunders
| KO (knees)
| UFC 106
| 
| align=center| 1
| align=center| 3:24
| Las Vegas, Nevada, United States
| 
|-
| Loss
| align=center| 16–5
| Dan Hardy
| Decision (split)
| UFC 99
| 
| align=center| 3
| align=center| 5:00
| Cologne, Germany
| 
|-
| Win
| align=center| 16–4
| Chris Lytle
| Decision (split)
| UFC 93
| 
| align=center| 3
| align=center| 5:00
| Dublin, Republic of Ireland
| Fight of the Night.
|-
| Win
| align=center| 15–4
| Paul Kelly
| Submission (guillotine choke)
| UFC 89
| 
| align=center| 2
| align=center| 2:16
| Birmingham, England
| 
|-
| Loss
| align=center| 14–4
| Mike Swick
| Decision (unanimous)
| UFC 85
| 
| align=center| 3
| align=center| 5:00
| London, England
| 
|-
| Win
| align=center| 14–3
| Jess Liaudin
| KO (punch)
| UFC 80
| 
| align=center| 1
| align=center| 1:04
| Newcastle upon Tyne, England
| 
|-
| Win
| align=center| 13–3
| Paul Taylor
| Submission (armbar)
| UFC 75
| 
| align=center| 1
| align=center| 4:14
| London, England
| Fight of the Night and Submission of the Night.
|-
| Win
| align=center| 12–3
| Jason Tan
| KO (punch)
| UFC 72
| 
| align=center| 1
| align=center| 1:15
| Belfast, Northern Ireland
| Knockout of the Night.
|-
| Win
| align=center| 11–3
| Pete Spratt
| Submission (achilles lock)
| UFC 69
| 
| align=center| 2
| align=center| 2:57
| Houston, Texas, United States
| 
|-
| Win
| align=center| 10–3
| Shonie Carter
| Decision (unanimous)
| UFC Fight Night: Sanchez vs. Riggs
| 
| align=center| 3
| align=center| 5:00
| San Diego, California, United States
| 
|-
| Win
| align=center| 9–3
| Forrest Petz
| Submission (guillotine choke)
| Ortiz vs. Shamrock 3: The Final Chapter
| 
| align=center| 1
| align=center| 4:58
| Hollywood, Florida, United States
| 
|-
| Win
| align=center| 8–3
| Mike Vaughn
| Submission (armbar)
| Wild Bill's: Fight Night 4
| 
| align=center| 1
| align=center| 4:14
| Georgia, United States
| 
|-
| Win
| align=center| 7–3
| Jason Hathaway
| TKO (punches)
| Wild Bill's: Fight Night 3
| 
| align=center| 1
| align=center| 1:19
| Atlanta, Georgia, United States
| 
|-
| Win
| align=center| 6–3
| Doug Gordon
| Decision (unanimous)
| CFFC 1
| 
| align=center| 3
| align=center| 5:00
| Atlantic City, New Jersey, United States
| 
|-
| Win
| align=center| 5–3
| Craig Gunder
| Submission (guillotine choke)
| CZ 16
| 
| align=center| 1
| align=center| 0:37
| Portsmouth, New Hampshire, United States
| 
|-
| Win
| align=center| 4–3
| Andy Normington
| Submission (neck crank)
| CZ 14
| 
| align=center| 1
| align=center| 1:41
| Manchester, New Hampshire, United States
| 
|-
| Loss
| align=center| 3–3
| Melvin Guillard
| TKO (doctor stoppage)
| The Ultimate Fighter 2 Finale
| 
| align=center| 2
| align=center| 2:55
| Las Vegas, Nevada, United States
| 
|-
| Win
| align=center| 3–2
| Renat Myzabekov
| Technical Submission (armbar)
| CZ 10 
| 
| align=center| 1
| align=center| 1:19
| Revere, Massachusetts, United States
|Lightweight debut; won vacant CZ Lightweight Championship.
|-
| Win
| align=center| 2–2
| Shaun Gay
| TKO (punches)
| CZ 7 
| 
| align=center| 1
| align=center| 1:33
| Revere, Massachusetts, United States
| 
|-
| Loss
| align=center| 1–2
| Nuri Shakir
| Submission (rear-naked choke)
| MMA: Eruption
| 
| align=center| 3
| align=center| 2:38
| Lowell, Massachusetts, United States
| 
|-
| Loss
| align=center| 1–1
| Thiago Alves
| Decision (split)
| HFC 2
| 
| align=center| 3
| align=center| 5:00
| Revere, Massachusetts, United States
| 
|-
| Win
| align=center| 1–0
| Shaun Gay
| TKO (punches)
| ISCF: Friday Night Fights
| 
| align=center| 1
| align=center| 2:09
| Atlanta, Georgia, United States
|

See also
 List of Bellator MMA alumni
 List of mixed martial artists with professional boxing records

References

External links
 
 
 
 

1973 births
Living people
Boxers from Maine
Super-middleweight boxers
American male kickboxers
Kickboxers from Maine
Cruiserweight kickboxers
Ultimate Fighting Championship male fighters
American male mixed martial artists
Mixed martial artists from Maine
Lightweight mixed martial artists
Welterweight mixed martial artists
Mixed martial artists utilizing boxing
Mixed martial artists utilizing karate
Sportspeople from Bangor, Maine
People from Houlton, Maine
American male boxers
American male karateka